Pseudotorinia is a genus of sea snails, marine gastropod mollusks in the family Architectonicidae, the staircase shells or sundials.

Species
The following species are included in the genus Pseudotorinia:
 Pseudotorinia "architae-group" (temporary name)
Pseudotorinia aloysii (Selli, 1973)
Pseudotorinia amoena (Murdoch & Suter, 1906)
Pseudotorinia architae (O. G. Costa, 1841)
Pseudotorinia armillata Bieler, 1993Pseudotorinia bullisi Bieler, Merrill & Boss, 1985Pseudotorinia colmani (Garrard, 1977)Pseudotorinia concava (Thiele, 1925)Pseudotorinia delectabilis (Melvill, 1893)Pseudotorinia gemmulata (Thiele, 1925)Pseudotorinia jonasi Tenório, Barros, Francisco & Silva, 2011Pseudotorinia kraussi J.E. Gray in M. E. Gray, 1850Pseudotorinia laseronorum (Iredale, 1936)Pseudotorinia numulus (Barnard, 1963)
 † Pseudotorinia obtusa (Bronn, 1831) Pseudotorinia panamensis (Bartsch, 1918)Pseudotorinia phorcysi Cavallari, Salvador & Simone, 2014Pseudotorinia sestertius Bieler, 1993Pseudotorinia yaroni Bieler, 1993
Species brought into synonymy
 Pseudotorinia retifera (Dall, 1892): synonym of the Pseudotorinia "architae-group"''

References

 Mestayer, M. K. (1930). Notes on New Zealand Mollusca. No. 5. Transactions of the New Zealand Institute 61: 144–146.

External links
 Sacco, F. (1892). I molluschi dei terreni terziarii del Piemonte e della Liguria. Parte XII. (Pyramidellidae (fine), Ringiculidae, Solariidae e Scalariidae (aggiunte)). Carlo Clausen, Torino, 88 pp., 2 pls
 Gofas, S.; Le Renard, J.; Bouchet, P. (2001). Mollusca. in: Costello, M.J. et al. (eds), European Register of Marine Species: a check-list of the marine species in Europe and a bibliography of guides to their identification. Patrimoines Naturels. 50: 180-213
 Neave, Sheffield Airey. (1939-1996). Nomenclator Zoologicus vol. 1-10 Online.

Architectonicidae
Cenozoic first appearances